Peter Schmitz (20 January 1895 – 11 July 1964) was a German composer. His work was part of the music event in the art competition at the 1928 Summer Olympics.

References

1895 births
1964 deaths
German composers
Olympic competitors in art competitions
Musicians from Cologne